Kalen Daron King (born January 28, 2003) is an American football cornerback for the Penn State Nittany Lions.

Early life and high school career
King grew up in Detroit, Michigan and attended Cass Technical High School. King was rated a four-star recruit and committed to play college football at Penn State over offers from Michigan, Wisconsin, and Michigan State.

College career
King joined the Penn State Nittany Lions as an early enrollee in January 2021. He had 23 tackles, one tackle for loss, five passes broken up, and one forced fumble in 13 games as a freshman. King entered his sophomore season as a starter at cornerback.

Personal life
King's twin brother, Kobe, also plays for Penn State as a linebacker.

References

External links
Penn State Nittany Lions bio

Living people
Players of American football from Detroit
American football cornerbacks
Penn State Nittany Lions football players
Year of birth missing (living people)